Rampur Naikin is a town and nagar panchayat (a settlement in transition from rural to urban) in the Sidhi district of the Indian state of Madhya Pradesh.

References

Cities and towns in Sidhi district